The American 14.6 is an American sailing dinghy that was first built in 1988.

Production
The design has built by American Sail in the United States since 1988 and remains in production. 1200 examples have been completed.

Design

The American 14.6 is a recreational sailboat, built predominantly of fiberglass, with closed-cell flotation and  anodized aluminum spars. It has raked stem, a vertical transom, a transom-hung, kick-up, spring-loaded rudder controlled by a tiller and a centerboard. It displaces  and can accommodate four people. Features include a storage area for lunches and drinks.

The boat is delivered with a  capacity trailer.

The boat is equipped with a motor bracket and can fitted with a small outboard motor for docking and maneuvering.

Operational history
A review in boats.com described the design as, "as an extremely stable, large, dry, daysailer providing fun for all ages".

The Society for the Education of American Sailors noted the design "is designed for the beginning sailor or those who are seeking a large, stable sloop that offers hassle-free sailing."

See also
List of sailing boat types

Similar sailboats
Laser 2

References

External links

Dinghies
1980s sailboat type designs
Sailing yachts
Sailboat types built by American Sail